Andrei Vasilyevich Kobenko (born 25 June 1982) is a former Russian footballer.

Club career
He made his Russian Premier League debut for FC Amkar Perm on 1 May 2004 in a game against FC Shinnik Yaroslavl.

In early 2009, FC Terek Grozny have signed the attacking midfielder from rivals and Russian reigning champions FC Rubin Kazan.

Personal life
He is a younger brother of Aleksandr Kobenko.

External links
 
 
  Player page on the official FC Rubin Kazan website
 

1982 births
Living people
People from Maykop
Russian footballers
FC Amkar Perm players
FC Rubin Kazan players
FC Akhmat Grozny players
Russian Premier League players
FC Chernomorets Novorossiysk players
FC Salyut Belgorod players
FC Armavir players
FC Slavyansk Slavyansk-na-Kubani players
Association football midfielders
FC Rostov players
Sportspeople from Adygea